Lederbergvirus (synonyms P22-like viruses, P22-like phages, P22likevirus) is a genus of virusesin the order Caudovirales, in the family Podoviridae. Bacteria serve as natural hosts, with transmission achieved through passive diffusion. There are six species in this genus.

Taxonomy
The following six species are assigned to the genus:
 Escherichia virus HK620
 Salmonella virus BTP1
 Salmonella virus P22
 Salmonella virus SE1Spa
 Salmonella virus ST64T
 Shigella virus Sf6

Structure
Lederbergviruses are nonenveloped, with a head and tail. The head is icosahedral with T=7 symmetry, with a diameter of approximately 60 to 65 nm. The tail is non-contractile with six prominent tail spikes.

Genome
Several species have been fully sequenced. They range between 38k and 42k nucleotides, with 58 to 72 proteins. Complete genomes, as well as several similar unclassified strains are available from

Life cycle
Viral replication is cytoplasmic. The virus attaches to the host cell using its terminal fibers, and ejects the viral DNA into the host periplasm. DNA-templated transcription is the method of transcription. Once the viral genes have been replicated, new virions are assembled in the host's cytoplasm, and mature virions are released via lysis and holin/endolysin/spanin proteins.

History
According to ICTV's 1996 report, the genus P22likevirus was first accepted under the name P22-like phages, assigned only to family Podoviridae. The whole family was moved to the newly created order Caudovirales in 1998, and the genus was renamed to P22-like viruses in ICTV's seventh report in 1999. In 2012, the genus was renamed again, this time to P22likevirus. The genus was later renamed to Lederbergvirus.

References

External links
 Viralzone: P22likevirus
 ICTV

Podoviridae
Virus genera